The Lehigh River is a  tributary of the Delaware River in eastern Pennsylvania. The river flows in a generally southward pattern from the Pocono Mountains in Northeastern Pennsylvania through Allentown and much of the Lehigh Valley before enjoining the Delaware River in Easton.  

Part of the Lehigh River and a number of its tributaries are designated Pennsylvania Scenic Rivers by the state's Department of Conservation and Natural Resources.

The river's name is an anglicisation of the Lenape name for the river, Lechewuekink, which means "where there are forks". Both Lehigh County and Lehigh Valley are named for the river.

According to an environmental report from a Pennsylvania nonprofit research center, the Lehigh River watershed is ranked second nationally in the volume of toxic substances released into it in 2020.
The study mirrors a previous report by the state's Department of Environmental Protection that found most of the county's waterways unsafe for swimming or aquatic life.

Course

The Lehigh River flows in a highly winding course through valleys between ridges of Pennsylvania's Appalachian Mountains. Its upper course is characterized by numerous whitewater rapids and supports recreational pursuits, including rafting, kayaking, and canoeing. Its lower course forms the heart of the Lehigh Valley, a historically important anthracite coal and steel-producing region of Pennsylvania.

The PA Gazetteer of Streams shows that the Lehigh River begins as the outflow of Pocono Peak Lake. Flowing south from the south end of the lake (a natural but dammed body of water), the river turns west after a mile and receives water from many lakes and ponds as it flows past Gouldsboro.

It flows initially southwest through southern Lackawanna County and then through Francis E. Walter Dam. Near White Haven, it turns south, following a zigzag whitewater course through Lehigh Gorge State Park to Jim Thorpe, then southeast, past Lehighton. Southeast of Lehighton, it passes through Blue Mountain in the narrow opening at Lehigh Gap. A six-mile stretch of the river between Freemansburg and Easton is known as the "dry-lands" because all of the water from rain drainage flows underground. 

From the Lehigh Gap, the river flows southeast to Allentown, where it is joined by Little Lehigh Creek, then northeast past Bethlehem, where it joins the Delaware River in Easton at Pennsylvania's border with northwestern New Jersey.

Fishing
The Lehigh River holds many species of fish, including trout, smallmouth bass, largemouth bass, pickerel, panfish, carp, catfish, eel, and muskie. Rainbow trout, brown trout, and brook trout in the 11"-14" range are average, while some have been caught in the 20" range. Smallmouth bass are large in numbers but are of smaller size with most between 8"-14" with an occasional fish from the 18"-21" range. There is an increasing number of muskie being reported within the 30"-52" range. There are both pure and tiger muskie, the usually sterile, hybrid offspring of the true muskellunge (Esox masquinongy) and the northern pike (Esox lucius) being caught in the river.

Over the years since 2005 various groups such as the Lehigh Coldwater Fishery Alliance and the Pennsylvania Fish and Boat Commission have worked with the Army Corps of Engineers to design annual flow plans from the Frances Walter Dam (F.E.W.) to maximize the cold water discharge through the spring and summer. This has helped enhance the population of coldwater species like brown trout to gain a growing naturally reproducing population within the river below F.E.W. dam all the way to Northampton.

Whitewater rafting and tubing

The Lehigh River is a whitewater river with Class I, II, and III rapids. The most popular section of the Lehigh River for whitewater rafting, kayaking, and canoeing is through the Lehigh Gorge State Park. The Lehigh Gorge State Park begins at the Francis E. Walter Dam and ends in Jim Thorpe. Several white water outfitters operate guided white water rafting trips in various sections of the river. The first rafting outfitter on the Lehigh River was Whitewater Challengers, which was founded in 1975. Water releases from the Francis E. Walter Dam provide enough water to make the river deep enough for boating. Three popular boating trips on the Lehigh River are: 
 White Haven to Rockport – 8.7 miles
 Rockport to Glen Onoko – 12.2 miles
 White Haven to Glen Onoko – 20.9 miles

See also
Delaware and Lehigh National Heritage Corridor
Lehigh Canal
List of Pennsylvania rivers

References

External links

 
Delaware Valley
History of Allentown, Pennsylvania
Rivers of Carbon County, Pennsylvania
Rivers of Lackawanna County, Pennsylvania
Rivers of Lehigh County, Pennsylvania
Rivers of Luzerne County, Pennsylvania
Rivers of Monroe County, Pennsylvania
Rivers of Northampton County, Pennsylvania
Pocono Mountains
Rivers of Wayne County, Pennsylvania
Scenic Rivers of Pennsylvania
Tributaries of the Delaware River